Henry A. Lefkowitz (August 31, 1923 – April 21, 2007) was a professional basketball player. He played for the Cleveland Rebels of the Basketball Association of America (now known as the National Basketball Association).

High school career
Hank played high school basketball for Cleveland Heights High School, where he led the 1941 team to a Lake Erie League championship and earned All Lake Erie League honors.

College career
Hank played college basketball at Western Reserve University (now known as Case Western Reserve University) where he was twice named co-captain and was named to the first All-Mid-American Conference team in 1946.

Professional career
Hank played in 24 games for the Cleveland Rebels during the 1946–47 BAA season.

BAA career statistics

Regular season

Playoffs

References

External links
 
 

1923 births
2007 deaths
American men's basketball players
Basketball players from Cleveland
Case Western Spartans men's basketball players
Cleveland Rebels players
Forwards (basketball)
Cleveland Heights High School alumni